Bass Hill, a suburb of local government area City of Canterbury-Bankstown, is located 23 kilometres south-west of the Sydney central business district, in the state of New South Wales, Australia, and is a part of the South-western Sydney region.

History
Bass Hill is named after George Bass, a surgeon and explorer who was granted land here in 1798. He had arrived in the colony in 1795 on HMS Reliance and became friendly with midshipman Matthew Flinders and on arrival they decided to explore parts of the colony. In 1796 on a small boat called the Tom Thumb accompanied by a boy servant William Martin, they sailed into Botany Bay and explored the Georges River, twenty miles (32 km) beyond previous expeditions. They sailed as far as present day Georges Hall. For their exploration efforts Bass and Flinders were rewarded with  land grants in this area by Governor Hunter.

The area developed rapidly after the completion of Liverpool Road in 1814. Originally known as Irish Town because of the Irish settlements, it later became known as Upper Bankstown. It became officially known as Bass Hill in October 1924.

During World War II, Bass Hill was the location for a small transmitting station that was owned and operated by the RAAF. It was located on the corner of Manuka Crescent & Johnston Road. This facility worked in conjunction with the Bankstown Bunker on Black Charlies Hill in Condell Park, which also worked in conjunction with a remote receiving station that was located in Picnic Point.

Commercial area

The shopping centre includes a Woolworths Supermarket, Kmart, Aldi, Medical Centre, Post Office and approximately 60 specialty stores.

Adjacent to the centre a new residential housing estate, Viewpoint, is being developed on the former Bass Hill drive-in cinema.

Education
Bass Hill has three schools, Bass Hill Public School for years K-6, George Bass School for students with special needs and Bass High School for years 7–12.

Sport

Bass Hill is home to many sporting fields and facilities which cater for sports such as athletics, cricket, cycling, hockey, rugby league, and soccer.

The Crest sporting complex contains the Dunc Gray Velodrome, which was home of the track cycling events for the 2000 Summer Olympics and the Cycling World Cup, a state of the art athletics complex, soccer fields, hockey fields, and cricket fields. The Crest was home to the Sydney Bulls Jim Beam Cup Rugby League Club, South West Strikers Soccer Club, Bankstown District Sports Club Hockey Club, Banksports Athletics, Bankstown Sports Cycling Club, and Bankstown Sports Gymnastics.

Population
In the 2016 census the population of Bass Hill was 9,069, 50.7% female and 49.3% male.

The median age of the Bass Hill population was 34 years, 4 years below the national median of 38.

58.5% of people were born in Australia. The next most common countries of birth were Lebanon 8.2%, Vietnam 7.2%, Italy 1.4%, Iraq 1.3% and China 1.2%.

37.6% of people only spoke English at home. Other languages spoken at home included Arabic 27.6%, Vietnamese 9.6%, Greek 2.6%, Italian 2.1% and Cantonese 1.8%.

The most common responses for religion in Bass Hill were Islam 27.7%, Catholic 26.0% and No Religion 9.2%.

References

External links

Suburbs of Sydney
City of Canterbury-Bankstown